Ames is a commune in the Pas-de-Calais department in the Hauts-de-France region of France.

Geography

Population

Sights
 The church of Saint-Pierre, dating from the twelfth century
 The war memorial

See also
Communes of the Pas-de-Calais department

References

Communes of Pas-de-Calais